Samba Félix N’diaye (6 March 1945–6 November 2009), was a Sénégalese filmmaker. One of the early pillars in Senegalese cinema industry, Ndiaye is regarded as the father of the African documentary. He made several critically acclaimed Documentary shorts Trésors des poubelles, Ngor, l'esprit des lieux, Les malles and Geti Tey. Apart from direction, he is also a writer and cinematographer.

Personal life
Ndiaye was born on 6 March 1945 in Dakar, Senegal. He regularly attended the film club of the French Cultural Center in Dakar which he done as a habit. He later training in law and economics at the University of Dakar. Then he attended the University of Paris VIII and obtained Masters in Cinema and Audiovisual Studies. Then he joined with the Institut Lumière to study cinematography and editing.

He died on 6 November 2009 in Dakar at the age of 64 due to complications from cerebral malaria. He was later buried in Yoff cemetery.

Career
In 1974, he directed his maiden documentary short Perantal, as part of his master's degree in cinema. In 1978, he made the short Geti Tey which discussed the difficulties faced by artisanal fishermen from Kayar, Hann or Soumbédioune whose activity is endangered by the boom in fishing. After that, Ndiaye made the a series of five short films gathered under the title Trésors des poubelles in 1989. In the same year, he made the short Aqua, an “urban metonymy” which is almost without words. 

In 1994, Ndiaye made his maiden feature film Ngor, l'esprit des lieux about the inhabitants of Ngor, a village located on the outskirts of Dakar. Since late 1990s, he mostly concerned about political thematic documentaries and made Lettre à Senghor in 1998. As a writer, he wrote the documentary Rwanda, pour mémoire which focused on the Rwandan genocide of 1994. In 2007 in his late years, Ndiaye made the documentary Questions à la terre natale. In 2012, he won the award at the Cordoba African Film Festival for his film Trésors des poubelles.

Filmography

References

External links
 

2009 deaths
Senegalese film directors
1945 births
Senegalese film producers
Documentary film directors